

Wala may refer to:

Places
Wala (island), a small island in Vanuatu, and a popular destination for cruise ships
Wala, Panama, a community in Kuna de Wargandí, Panama
Kingdom of Wala a pre-colonial polity in the north of modern Ghana
Waalo, an empire in West Africa between the 13th and 19th Centuries

People
Wala of Corbie (755–836), an advisor to the Frankish kings including Charlemagne
Sidhu Moose Wala (1993–2022), Indian singer, rapper, actor and politician
Wala, an Indian name

Language
Wala people, an ethnic group in Ghana
Wala language (disambiguation), several languages
 Wallah or Wala, a suffix in several Indo-Aryan languages

Other
Wala (goddess), a sun goddess in Australian aboriginal spirituality
Weighted Average Loan Age, a term relating to mortgage-backed securities
WALA-TV, a FOX television station in southern United States
Walo (rodent), a variety of gerbil from Somalia

See also
Vala (disambiguation)
Walla (disambiguation)
Walla Walla (disambiguation) 
Wallah (disambiguation)